Carlos Sao Murry Ulberg (born 17 November 1990) is a New Zealand mixed martial artist who competes in the Light heavyweight division of the Ultimate Fighting Championship.

Background

Ulberg was born in New Zealand to parents of German, Māori and Samoan descent. He was raised by a foster family in South Auckland from the age of four and attended Hillary College throughout his upbringing. Ulberg began playing rugby league as a child, a sport in which he would later compete at the semi-professional level when he became a Counties-Manukau representative. He was a contestant on the Game Of Bros reality television show in 2018 and was twice offered the opportunity to star in New Zealand's version of The Bachelor.

Ulberg works part-time as a model.

Professional boxing career
In August 2015, Ulberg fought in his first and only professional boxing fight, with his stable mate Sam Rapira main eventing the card. Ulberg took on undefeated boxer Daniel Meehan. Ulberg won the fight by unanimous decision.

Mixed martial arts career

Early career
Ulberg made his MMA debut in 2011 for the King of the Door promotion when he faced Kaota Puna and secured a second round knockout in his first professional fight.

Dana White's Contender Series  
Ulberg competed at Dana White's Contender Series 34 on 4 November 2020 and earned himself a UFC contract via a first round knockout of Bruno Oliveira.

Ultimate Fighting Championship
Ulberg made his UFC debut on 6 March 2021 at UFC 259 where he faced Kennedy Nzechukwu. Ulberg had Nzechukwu in trouble early with a flurry of strikes, but quickly became exhausted and ultimately lost the fight via knockout in the second round. This fight earned him the Fight of the Night award.

Ulberg faced Fabio Cherant on 12 February 2022 at UFC 271. He won the fight via unanimous decision.

Ulberg faced Tafon Nchukwi on 25 June 2022, at UFC on ESPN: Tsarukyan vs. Gamrot. He won via TKO in the first round.

Ulberg faced Nicolae Negumereanu on November 12, 2022, at UFC 281. He won the fight via knockout in the first round.

Championships and accomplishments

Mixed martial arts 
 Ultimate Fighting Championships
 Fight of the Night (One time)

Kickboxing
King in the Ring
 2017 King in the Ring 100 kg Tournament Champion
 2019 King in the Ring 92 kg Tournament Champion

Mixed martial arts record

|Win
|align=center|7–1
|Nicolae Negumereanu
|KO (punches)
|UFC 281
| 
|align=center|1
|align=center|3:44
|New York City, New York, United States
|
|-
|Win
|align=center|6–1
|Tafon Nchukwi
|TKO (punches)	
|UFC on ESPN: Tsarukyan vs. Gamrot
|
|align=center|1
|align=center|1:15
|Las Vegas, Nevada, United States
|
|-
|Win
|align=center|5–1
|Fabio Cherant
|Decision (unanimous)
|UFC 271
|
|align=center|3
|align=center|5:00
|Houston, Texas, United States
|
|-
|Loss
|align=center|4–1
|Kennedy Nzechukwu
|KO (punches)
|UFC 259
|
|align=center|2
|align=center|3:19
|Las Vegas, Nevada, United States
|
|-
|Win
|align=center| 4–0
|Bruno Oliveira
|KO (punches)
|Dana White's Contender Series 34
|
|align=center|1
|align=center|2:02
|Las Vegas, Nevada, United States
|
|-
| Win
| align=center| 3–0
| John Martin Fraser
| Decision (unanimous)
| Eternal MMA 40
| 
| align=center| 3
| align=center| 5:00
| Perth, Australia
|
|-
| Win
| align=center| 2–0
| Umed Rakhmatulloyev
| TKO (punches and knee)
| WKG International MMA Tournament 3
| 
| align=center| 1
| align=center| 3:03
| Heilongjiang, China
|
|-
| Win
| align=center| 1–0
| Kaota Puna
| TKO (punches)
| King of the Door: Submission 2
| 
| align=center| 2
| align=center| N/A
| Auckland, New Zealand
|

Kickboxing record

|-  bgcolor="#cfc"
| 2019-03-30 || Win||align=left| Fou Ah-Lam|| King in the Ring 92 kg II,  Final|| Auckland, New Zealand || KO (low kick) || 2|| 1:28
|-
! style=background:white colspan=9 |

|-  bgcolor="#cfc"
| 2019-03-30 || Win||align=left| Nato La'auli|| King in the Ring 92 kg II, Semi Final|| Auckland, New Zealand || KO (kick to the body) || 3|| 1:54

|-  bgcolor="#cfc"
| 2019-03-30 || Win||align=left| Julius Poananga|| King in the Ring 92 kg II, Quarter Final|| Auckland, New Zealand || TKO (punches and knees) || 3|| 0:48

|-  bgcolor="#cfc"
| 2018-07-28 || Win||align=left| Bruno Susano || EM Legend 32 || Chengdu, China || Decision (unanimous) || 3|| 3:00

|-  bgcolor="#cfc"
| 2018-04-21 || Win||align=left| Oleg Pryimachov || EM Legend 30 || Emei, China || Decision (unanimous) || 3|| 3:00

|-  bgcolor="#fbb"
| 2018-01-20 || Loss||align=left| Oleg Pryimachov || EM Legend 27|| Kunming, China || Decision (unanimous) || 3|| 3:00

|-  bgcolor="#cfc"
| 2017-09-29 || Win||align=left| Stanislav || EM Legend 23 || Yilong, China || TKO (corner stoppage) || 2|| 0:34

|-  bgcolor="#cfc"
| 2017-06-30 || Win||align=left| Nato Laauli|| King in the Ring 100kg III, Final|| Auckland, New Zealand || TKO (punches) || 2|| 0:41
|-
! style=background:white colspan=9 |

|-  bgcolor="#cfc"
| 2017-06-30 || Win||align=left| Ata Fakalelu || King in the Ring 100kg III, Semi Final|| Auckland, New Zealand || Decision (majority) || 3|| 3:00

|-  bgcolor="#cfc"
| 2017-06-30 || Win||align=left| Tafa Misipati || King in the Ring 100kg III, Quarter Final|| Auckland, New Zealand || KO (front kick) || 2|| 1:52

|-  bgcolor="#cfc"
| 2017-03-31 || Win||align=left| Jake Heun || EM Legend 17 || Emei, China || Decision (unanimous) || 3|| 3:00

|-  bgcolor="#cfc"
| 2016-12-23 || Win||align=left| Sherzad Babazhanau || EM Legend 15 || Emei, China || TKO (retirement) || 2|| 2:30
|- 
|-  bgcolor="#fbb"
| 2016-09-23 || Loss||align=left| Sergej Maslobojev || EM Legend 12 || Chengdu, China || TKO (Low kicks) || 3|| 2:31

|-
| colspan=9 | Legend:

Professional boxing record

See also 
 List of current UFC fighters
 List of male mixed martial artists

References

External links 
  
  
 

1990 births
Living people
Sportspeople from Auckland
New Zealand male kickboxers
New Zealand male boxers
New Zealand male mixed martial artists
Light heavyweight mixed martial artists
Mixed martial artists utilizing kickboxing
Mixed martial artists utilizing boxing
Ultimate Fighting Championship male fighters
New Zealand Māori sportspeople
New Zealand sportspeople of Samoan descent
New Zealand people of German descent